Uno is a game for the Game Boy Color based on the card game of the same name. It was released by Mattel Games on December 16, 1999.

References

External links 
UNO GBC at IGN.com
UNO GBC at GameSpot
Mattel Games
HotGames

1999 video games
Game Boy Color games
Game Boy Color-only games
HotGen games
Mattel video games
Multiplayer and single-player video games
Uno (card game) video games
Video games developed in the United Kingdom